Lat-e Parshu (also Romanized as Lāt-e Parshū; also known as Lāt-e Parūsheh) is a village in Rahimabad Rural District, Rahimabad District, Rudsar County, Gilan Province, Iran. At the 2006 census, its population was 38, in 7 families.

References 

Populated places in Rudsar County